Carmen Serano (born Carmen Maria Robles; August 18, 1973) is an American actress. She played Assistant Principal Carmen Molina in the television series Breaking Bad. She starred in the 2007 film Urban Justice alongside Steven Seagal, and Deadly Impact (2010).

Personal life
She married actor Greg Serano in 1997. They live with son Mark and daughters Cheyenne and Nya in California.

Filmography

References

External links
 

1973 births
20th-century American actresses
21st-century American actresses
Actresses from California
Living people
People from Chula Vista, California
American film actresses
American television actresses
Hispanic and Latino American actresses